Geoffrey Brian West (born 15 December 1940) is a British theoretical physicist and former president and distinguished professor of the Santa Fe Institute. He is one of the leading scientists working on a scientific model of cities. Among other things, his work states that with the doubling of a city's population, salaries per capita will generally increase by 15%.

Biography 
Born in Taunton, Somerset, a rural town in western England, West moved to London when he was 13. He received a Bachelor of Arts degree in physics from the University of Cambridge and pursued graduate studies on the pion at Stanford University.

West became a Stanford faculty member before he joined the particle theory group at New Mexico's Los Alamos National Laboratory. After Los Alamos, he became president of the Santa Fe Institute, where he worked and works on biological issues such as the allometric law and other power laws in biology.

West has since been honoured as one of Time magazine's Time 100. He is a member of the World Knowledge Dialogue Scientific Board.

See also
Through the Wormhole#Season 3 (2012)

Selected publications 
 Necia Grant Cooper, Geoffrey B. West (eds.) Particle Physics: A Los Alamos Primer. CUP Archive, 29 April 1988.
 Brown, James H., and Geoffrey B. West, eds. Scaling in biology. Oxford University Press, 2000.
 

Articles (selection)
 
 West, Geoffrey B., James H. Brown, and Brian J. Enquist. "The fourth dimension of life: fractal geometry and allometric scaling of organisms." science 284.5420 (1999): 1677–1679.
 West, Geoffrey B., James H. Brown, and Brian J. Enquist. "A general model for the structure and allometry of plant vascular systems." Nature 400.6745 (1999): 664–667.
 
 
 Bettencourt, L. M., Lobo, J., Helbing, D., Kühnert, C., & West, G. B. (2007). "Growth, innovation, scaling, and the pace of life in cities." Proceedings of the national academy of sciences, 104(17), 7301–7306.

References

External links

"Yeah, but what about the crayfish?" – Article about West's scaling law work on PhysicsWorld.com
Scaling Laws In Biology And Other Complex Systems – Talk he gave at Google

The surprising math of cities and corporations – TED Talk
"New York Times" article about West's work on biological scaling
New York Times article about West's work on cities

1940 births
Living people
Alumni of the University of Cambridge
Complex systems scientists
English biophysicists
English physicists
Los Alamos National Laboratory personnel
People from Santa Fe, New Mexico
People from Taunton
Scientific American people
Stanford University alumni
University of New Mexico faculty
Santa Fe Institute people
Fellows of the American Physical Society